This is a partial list of alumni and staff of the Open University.

Alumni

The OU has over two million alumni, including:

Politicians
Fleur Anderson, Labour MP
Ian Byrne, Labour MP
Laurie Bristow, British diplomat
Aimee Challenor, British politician and transgender activist
Barbara Follett, Labour MP
Gerald Gardiner, Baron Gardiner, former Lord High Chancellor of Great Britain, completed his degree whilst serving as Chancellor of the Open University
Bill Henderson, member of the House of Keys (Isle of Man)
David Heyes, Labour MP
Adam Ingram, Labour Minister of State, Northern Ireland Office
Andrea Jenkyns, Conservative MP
Marat Khusnullin – Deputy Prime Minister of Russia
Peter Law, Welsh politician and Independent Member of Parliament for Blaenau Gwent
John McFall, Labour MP and Senior Deputy Speaker of the House of Lords
Wendy Morton – Conservative MP and Minister for European Neighbourhood and the Americas
Chris Pond, former Labour Parliamentary Under-Secretary of State, Department for Work and Pensions
John Reid – Former Labour Home Secretary and Minister.
Graham Smith, CEO of Republic
Meles Zenawi, former Prime Minister of Ethiopia

Entertainers
Joan Armatrading, singer/songwriter
Connie Booth, actress
 Katy Cavanagh – actress
Julie Christie, actress
Lisa Coleman, actress and volunteer occupational therapist
Micky Dolenz, formerly of The Monkees
 Lionel Fanthorpe, priest, entertainer, television presenter, author and lecturer
Romola Garai, actress
Hubert Gregg, radio presenter
Jerry Hall, model/actress
Frank Hampson, creator of Dan Dare
Sheila Hancock, actress
Lenny Henry, entertainer
Matthew Kelly, television presenter
Mylene Klass, actress, singer, model, pianist and media personality

David Neilson, actor
Talulah Riley – actress
Julia Sawalha, actress
Graeme K Talboys, writer
Susan Tully, television producer and director; former actress
Holly Willoughby, television presenter

Scientists and engineers
Nigel Roberts FRSA, Computer Scientist
Carley Stevens, plant ecologist and soil biogeochemist
Chris Whitty, Chief Medical Officer for England
Robin Wilson, mathematician

Law
Nigel Bridge, Lord Bridge of Harwich, retired Law Lord

Sport
Craig Brown, football manager
Frank Turner,  three-times  Olympic gymnast
Ben Davies (footballer)

Military
Air Chief Marshal Sir Brian Burridge, Royal Air Force officer
Peter Cottrell, author, historian and former Royal Navy and British Army officer

Religion
Eric Nash Devenport, Bishop of Dunwich

Miscellaneous
Elizabeth Arnold, children's writer
 Bobby Cummines OBE FRSA – charity chief executive and reformed offender.
J. Colin Dodds, President of Saint Mary's University (Halifax)
Christine Grosart, cave diver and explorer
 Jeanette Henderson - author, academic, Specialist Lay Mental health Tribunal judge, social worker, radio broadcaster
 Myra Hindley – convicted murderer and prisoner
Air-Vice Marshal David Anthony Hobart, Royal Air Force officer 
 Gerry Hughes – sailor, first single-handed crossing of the Atlantic by a deaf person.
Natalya Kaspersky – co-founder and co-owner of Kaspersky Lab
 Paul Marsden – writer, businessman and former Labour/Liberal Democrat MP.
Ian Rankin – Scottish writer
Ken Robinson  – educationalist
Gwyn Singleton - dyslexia educationalist
 Mary Stuart – Vice-Chancellor of the University of Lincoln
Peter Ventress, Non-executive Chairman of Galliford Try
Natalie Wood, The Apprentice contestant

Honorary graduates
Sir David Attenborough – British broadcaster and naturalist (honorary graduate)
Tim Berners-Lee – engineer, computer scientist and inventor of the World Wide Web; recipient of OU honorary doctorate
Gordon Brown – Prime Minister of the United Kingdom (honorary doctorate)
Brian Cox – physicist (honorary doctorate)
Richard Dawkins –  British ethologist, evolutionary biologist and author (honorary doctorate)
Edward Heath –  Prime Minister of the United Kingdom from 1970 to 1974 and Leader of the Conservative Party from 1965 to 1975 (honorary doctorate)
Terry Pratchett – English fantasy author (honorary doctorate)

Staff
 Katharine Ellis, music historian
 John Fauvel, historian of mathematics
 Derek S. Pugh, Professor Emeritus for International Management
 Robin Wilson, mathematician

References

Open University Alumni